The 2023 IHF Men's Youth World Championship will be 10th edition of the championship to be held from 2 to 13 August 2023 in Croatia under the aegis of International Handball Federation (IHF). It will be first time in history that the championship will be organised by Croatian Handball Federation.

Bidding process
Two nations entered bid for hosting the tournament:
 
 

Slovenia later withdrew their bid. The tournament was awarded to Croatia by IHF Council in its meeting held in Cairo, Egypt on 28 February 2020.

Qualification

Draw
The draw took place on 3 March 2023 in Croatia.

Preliminary round

Group A

Group B

Group C

Group D

Group E

Group F

Group G

Group H

References

External links
IHF website

2023 Youth
Men's Youth World Handball Championship
International handball competitions hosted by Croatia
2023 in Croatian sport
Men's Youth World Handball
World Men's Youth